Adisa Azapagić  (born 10 April 1961) is a chemical engineer and academic. She has served as Professor of Sustainable Chemical Engineering at the University of Manchester since 2006.

Early life and education 
Azapagic was born in 1961 in Tuzla, Bosnia and Herzegovina. She attended the University of Tuzla, and graduated in 1984 with a bachelor's degree in Chemical Engineering. She completed her doctoral studies at the University of Surrey, and earned her PhD on Environmental System Analysis using Life-cycle assessmentin 1996.

Research and career
Azapagic remained at the University of Surrey for thirteen years before moving to the University of Manchester. She leads the Sustainable Industrial Systems research group at the University of Manchester. She runs several industry collaborations, including projects with Procter & Gamble, Kraft Foods, Whirlpool Corporation. In 2015 she won the University of Manchester award for Outstanding Benefit to Society. Azapagic developed software to calculate carbon footprint at the University of Manchester (CCaLC).

Her research interests lie in engineering for sustainable development, which includes sustainable technology, life cycle assessment and carbon footprinting. In 2018 she demonstrated that the UK's chocolate industry generates the same amount of greenhouse gases as Malta.

Azapagic is the founding editor-in-chief of Elsevier's Sustainable Production and Consumption. She has written three books, looking at sustainable development and polymers.

Awards and honours
Azapagic was elected a Fellow of the Royal Academy of Engineering (FREng) in 2013. She was appointed Member of the Order of the British Empire (MBE) in the 2020 New Year Honours for services to sustainability and carbon footprinting. She was awarded an honorary doctoral degree from Gheorghe Asachi Technical University of Iași. She is part of the all-party manufacturing group. She is a member of the American Institute of Chemical Engineers. In 2010 she was awarded the Institution of Chemical Engineers prize for Outstanding Achievements in Chemical and Process Engineering. She won the GlaxoSmithKline Innovation prize in 2011.

References 

British chemical engineers
Women chemical engineers
Fellows of the Institution of Chemical Engineers
Female Fellows of the Royal Academy of Engineering
Fellows of the Royal Academy of Engineering
Fellows of the Royal Society of Chemistry
Alumni of the University of Surrey
1961 births
Living people
Members of the Order of the British Empire
Bosnia and Herzegovina emigrants to the United Kingdom
Naturalised citizens of the United Kingdom
People from Tuzla